Hurricane Faith was a long-lived Cape Verde hurricane and was the sixth named storm and fifth hurricane of the 1966 Atlantic hurricane season. Faith developed from an area of disturbed weather between Cape Verde and the west coast of Africa on August 21. Tracking westward, the depression gradually intensified and became Tropical Storm Faith on the following day. Moving westward across the Atlantic Ocean, it continued to slowly strengthen, reaching hurricane status early on August 23. Located near the Lesser Antilles, the outer bands of Faith produced gale-force winds in the region, especially Puerto Rico, the Virgin Islands, and Antigua. Minor coastal damage occurred as far south as Trinidad and Tobago.

By August 28, the storm began to re-intensify, after curving north-northwestward near The Bahamas. At 0000 UTC on the following day, Faith peaked as a  Category 3 hurricane Saffir–Simpson hurricane scale. Eventually, the storm weakened back to a Category 2 hurricane and re-curved to the northeast. One person drowned in the western Atlantic after his ship sank. Heavy rainfall and strong winds pelted Bermuda, though no damage occurred. The storm maintained nearly the same intensity as a Category 2 hurricane for several days, while tracking northeastward into the far North Atlantic Ocean. Faith finally weakened while north of Great Britain and became extratropical near the Faroe Islands on September 6. Three other drowning deaths occurred in the North Sea near Denmark. A fifth death occurred after a man succumbed to injuries sustained during a boating incident related to the storm.

Meteorological history

Television Infrared Observation Satellite XI (TIROS XI) imagery indicated the presence of an area of disturbed weather over Ivory Coast on August 18. The system moved slowly westward and eventually reached the Atlantic Ocean. Continuing westward, the depression intensified, and was upgraded to Tropical Storm Faith on the following day. By August 23, Faith was upgraded to a Category 1 hurricane. Hurricane Faith curved to the northwest and weakened back to a Category 1 hurricane while approaching the northeastern Leeward Islands on August 25. Initially, Faith was scheduled to be seeded as part of Project Stormfury. However, the scheduled seeding was cancelled as Faith was approaching The Bahamas. Bypassing the Leeward Islands, Faith remained at nearly the same intensity, until re-strengthening into Category 2 hurricane on August 28, near Turks and Caicos Islands. The storm quickly intensified further into a Category 3 hurricane only six hours later.

After reaching maximum sustained winds late on August 29, Faith began to gradually weaken and decreased to Category 2 hurricane intensity early on August 30. By that time, the storm turned to the northeast around the periphery of an Atlantic subtropical anticyclone while located about midway between Bermuda and Florida. Faith remained well offshore of the East Coast of the United States and Atlantic Canada, after veering eastward on September 1. Thereafter, it began to accelerate and eventually curved northeastward. After remaining a Category 2 hurricane since August 29, Faith weakened slightly to a Category 1 hurricane early on September 6, as it neared the Faroe Islands. Tracking over Scandinavia, the extratropical storm weakened to the equivalent of a tropical depression before entering the Soviet Union (present day Russia).

Impact

In the Leeward Islands, the approach of Faith caused the tracking station on Antigua – which was monitoring an unmanned rocket launched by the National Aeronautics and Space Administration (NASA) – to shut down 45 minutes after the rocket lifted off. Faith also produced gale-force winds across Puerto Rico and the Virgin Islands, though only minor damage and no fatalities or injuries were reported. These conditions inflicted minor damage to small boats and jetties. Along the East Coast of the United States, the storm produced rough seas and high tides from Cape Canaveral (then Cape Kennedy), Florida, to the Virginia Capes. Additionally, the Weather Bureau warned of possible gale-force winds in The Carolinas and Virginia, but also noted that the area would only experience fringe effects from the storm.

Five people died as a result of the storm, though only one of them on land. Rough seas in the western Atlantic battered the Alberto Benati, pitching one man overboard. Two others drowned near Denmark while attempting to cross the Atlantic Ocean in a rowboat. Another man was missing and presumed dead after heavy seas forced him and his shipmates to abandon their boat off the northern coast of Denmark. Property damage was minimal, mainly because the areas impacted by Faith were sparsely populated. A 2,726 ton Norwegian car ferry known as Skagerak began to sink as it headed for Hirtshals in Region Nordjylland of Denmark. Waves pounded the side hatches, which flooded in the engine room, causing the ship to become disabled. A large-scale search operation was conducted to rescue the 144 passengers aboard. All passengers were rescued and treated for their injuries in Hjørring, Denmark. However, one person later died in the hospital. In Norway, the remnants of Faith impacted areas between Ryfylke and Sunnfjord. The storm brought heavy rainfall and resulted in glacier melting, which in turn caused rampant flooding in some locations. Discharge from the Folgefonna, Fjærland, and Sunnfjord glaciers reached a record high melt due to the remnants of Faith.

See also

 Tropical cyclone effects in Europe
List of Bermuda hurricanes
Atlantic hurricane records

References

Faith
Faith (1966)
Faith (1966)
Faith (1966)
Faith (1966)
Faith (1966)
Faith (1966)
Faith (1966)
Faith (1966)
Faith (1966)
Faith (1966)
Faith (1966)
Faith (1966)
Faith (1966)
Faith (1966)
Faith (1966)
History of British Antigua and Barbuda
1966 in Saint Kitts-Nevis-Anguilla